Paul Joseph Bradley (born October 18, 1945) is an American prelate of the Roman Catholic Church. He has been serving as bishop of the Diocese of Kalamazoo in Michigan since 2009.  He previously served as an auxiliary bishop of the Diocese of Pittsburgh from 2004 to 2009.

Biography

Early life 
Paul Bradley was born on October 18, 1945, in McKeesport, Pennsylvania, to John and Cecilia (née Pater) Bradley. One of nine children, he has one brother and eight sisters; two sisters, Roberta and Mariella, became nuns. Bradley attended St. Meinrad Seminary in St. Meinrad, Indiana, for his high school, college and theology studies.

Priesthood 
On May 1, 1971, Bradley was ordained to the priesthood for the Diocese of Pittsburgh by Bishop Vincent Leonard . He then served as parochial vicar in the following Pennsylvania parishes:

 St. Sebastian in North Hills 
 St. Paul in Butler
 St. Kieran in Lawrenceville 

At the same time, Bradley earned a Master of Social Work degree from the University of Pittsburgh. In 1973, Bradley became the youth director for the Northwest Deanery, working there until 1975.  In 1977. he became family life director for the Butler Deanery, working there until 1982.

In 1983, Bradley became the director of the diocesan Office for Family Life. In 1988, he became diocesan secretary for human services, during which time he also served as co-pastor with then Reverend Daniel DiNardo of Madonna del Castello Parish in Swissvale, Pennsylvania.

In 1994, Bradley became pastor of St. Sebastian Parish. He also served as dean of the Northwest Deanery from 1998 to 2001. In January 2001, Bradley was named rector of St. Paul Cathedral and pastor of the cathedral parish . On November 7, 2003, he was made general secretary and vicar general of the diocese.

Auxiliary Bishop of Pittsburgh 
On December 16, 2004, Bradley was appointed auxiliary bishop of the Diocese of Pittsburgh and titular bishop of Afufenia by Pope John Paul II. He received his episcopal consecration on February 2, 2005, from then-Bishop Donald Wuerl, with then-Bishop DiNardo and Bishop David Zubik serving as co-consecrators, at St. Paul Cathedral. His selected as his episcopal motto: "Waiting in Joyful Hope."

In June 2006, Bradley was elected as apostolic administrator of the diocese, serving until the installation of Bishop Zubik in September 2007.

Bishop of Kalamazoo
On April 6, 2009, Bradley was named as the fourth bishop of the Diocese of Kalamazoo. Succeeding the retiring Bishop James A. Murray, Bradley was installed at St. Augustine Cathedral in Kalamazoo on June 5, 2009. As bishop, he serves over 107,000 Catholics in Southwestern Michigan. On March 22, 2014, Bradley released the following statement in response to a federal court ruling that the Michigan ban on same sex marriage was unconstitutional:With the stroke of a pen, the meaning of marriage, one of society's most sacred institutions and the very foundation of the family, has been redefined in our state.On September 4, 2018, Bradley proposed a ten-step plan for overhauling church policies on the reporting of sexual abuse allegations.  In January 2019, Bradley started a controversy when he assigned Archbishop Emeritus John Nienstedt, formerly of the Archdiocese of St. Paul and Minneapolis, to assist for several months at a parish in Battle Creek, Michigan.  Many parishioners did not want Nienstadt due to his failure to report sexual abuse claims.  After two weeks, Nienstadt left Battle Creek.  On January 19, Bradley made this statement:Archbishop Nienstedt's presence has unintentionally brought about a sense of disunity, fear, and hurt to many of you during this brief period of time....As your spiritual father and shepherd, I regret that more than words can express.

See also

 Catholic Church hierarchy
 Catholic Church in the United States
 Historical list of the Catholic bishops of the United States
 List of Catholic bishops of the United States
 Lists of patriarchs, archbishops, and bishops

References

External links
Roman Catholic Diocese Of Kalamazoo Official Site
St. Sebastian Church 
St. Paul Church
St. Kieran Church

Episcopal succession

1945 births
Living people
People from Glassport, Pennsylvania
21st-century Roman Catholic bishops in the United States
Religious leaders from Pittsburgh
University of Pittsburgh School of Social Work alumni
Saint Meinrad Seminary and School of Theology alumni
Roman Catholic bishops of Kalamazoo
Catholics from Pennsylvania